Avalon Park is a neighborhood community located in unincorporated Orange County, Florida, United States which is built on the principle of New Urbanism, also known as Neo-Traditionalism.

Community
Avalon Park is one of several New Urban communities in the Orlando metro area; other examples include Celebration, Florida and Baldwin Park. It has been described as "urban suburbia", and was planned as a diversified community for mixed income levels. The community is organized in a series of villages surrounding a core Town Center area, and features reduced parking and efficient bus routes. Residential development includes a mix of condominiums, apartments, town homes, and traditional homes. Avalon Park's design also includes space for storefronts, restaurants and other businesses in the community's downtown area.

Proximity to entertainment and attractions

Education

The Avalon Park community has five elementary schools (Avalon Elementary School, Stone Lakes Elementary School, Timber Lakes Elementary School, Camelot Elementary School, and Castle Creek Elementary School), two middle schools (Avalon Middle School and Timber Springs Middle School). The community of Avalon Park is zoned for Timber Creek High School and Orange Technical College - Avalon Campus, which offers vocational training. The University of Central Florida is within  as well.

References

External links
http://www.avalonpark.com/

New Urbanism communities
Unincorporated communities in Orange County, Florida
Planned communities in Florida
Unincorporated communities in Florida
1995 establishments in Florida